The Cedar Swamp River is a small river in Lakeville, Massachusetts that flows  in a northwesterly direction through the western part of the town to where it forms the Assonet River near the Freetown line, just south of the village of Myricks. It is a tributary of the Taunton River.

The river is crossed by a railroad line that was originally built as the Taunton and New Bedford Railroad in 1840. It is now operated by CSX.

See also
Taunton River Watershed

References

Rivers of Plymouth County, Massachusetts
Taunton River watershed
Rivers of Massachusetts